Itaíba is a city located in the state of Pernambuco, Brazil. It is located 306 km away from Recife, the capital of the state of Pernambuco.  It has an estimated (IBGE 2020) population of 26,308 inhabitants.

Geography
 State - Pernambuco
 Region - Agreste Pernambucano
 Boundaries - Tupanatinga   (N);  Alagoas state   (S);  Buique and Águas Belas   (E);   Manari and Alagoas state   (W).
 Area - 1068.29 km2
 Elevation - 478 m
 Hydrography - Ipanema River
 Vegetation - Caatinga Hiperxerófila
 Climate - Semi arid hot
 Annual average temperature - 24.1 c
 Distance to Recife - 331 km

Economy
The main economic activities in Itaíba are based in agribusiness, especially beans, corn; and livestock such as cattle (over 83,000 heads), goats, sheep, pigs, horses and poultry.

Economic indicators

Economy by Sector
2006

Health indicators

References

Municipalities in Pernambuco